The following is a list of notable events and releases of the year 2016 in Norwegian music.

Events

January
 21 – Ice Music Festival started in Geilo (January 21–24).
 27 – Bodø Jazz Open started in Bodø (January 27–30).
 29 – Nordlysfestivalen started in Tromsø (January 29 – February 7).

February
 4
 The Polarjazz Festival 2016 started in Longyearbyen (February 4–7).
 Kristiansund Opera Festival opened (February 4–20).
 5 – Knut Kristiansen and Bergen Big Band's release concert for the album Kuria Suite at Verftet in Bergen.
 7 – Oslo Operaball was arranged in Oslo (February 7).
 16 – Andreas Loven's release concert for the album District Six (Losen Records) at Victoria – National Jazz Scene in Oslo.
 17 – Uhørt! – Sund jazz program on tour at Victoria – National Jazz Scene in Oslo.
 27 – The 54th edition of the Norwegian national Melodi Grand Prix final will select Norway's entry for the Eurovision Song Contest 2016.

March
 2 – The By:Larm started in Oslo (March 2–5).
 3
 Frode Alnæs' release concert for the album Kanestrøm (Øra Fonogram) at Victoria – National Jazz Scene in Oslo.
 Vinterjazzfestivalen started in Fredrikstad (March 3–6).
 Oslo International Church Music Festival 2016 opened in Oslo (March 3–13).
 4 – Narvik Winter Festival started (March 4–13).
 18 – Vossajazz started in Voss (March 18–20).
 19
 Øyvind Skarbø was awarded the 2016 Vossajazzprisen.
  Nils Økland performs Glødetrådar, the commissioned work for Vossajazz 2016.
 23 – Inferno Metal Festival 2016 started in Oslo (March 23–26).

April
 21 – Nidaros Blues Festival opened in Trondheim (April 21–24).
 22 – SoddJazz started in Inderøy, Nord-Trøndelag (April 22–26).
 28 – Karmøygeddon Metal Festival started in Karmøy (April 28–30).

May
 2 – Trondheim Jazz Festival started (May 2 – 12).
 3 – MaiJazz 2016 started in Stavanger (May 3 – 7).
 4 – AnJazz the Hamar Jazz Festival started at Hamar, Norway (May 4 – 7).
 25 – The Festspillene i Bergen 2016 started (May 25 – June 8).
 26 – The Nattjazz 2016 started in Bergen (May 26 – June 3).

June
 2 – Christian Grøvlen is awarded the Robert Levins Pianistpris, a memorial prize, in Oslo by Mona Levin.
 15 – Bergenfest 2016 with headliner Sigur Rós (June 15 – 18).

July
 6
 Kongsberg Jazzfestival 2016 opened with Pat Metheny consert (August 6 – 9).
 Susanna Wallumrød was recipient of the Kongsberg Jazz Award or DNB.prisen 2016 at the Kongsberg Jazzfestival.
 18 – Moldejazz 2016 started with Ola Kvernberg as artist in residence (August 18 – 23).

August
 3 – The Notodden Blues Festival start in Notodden, Norway (August 3–6).
 4 – The 22nd Hemnesjazz started in Hemnesberget, Norway ( August 4–7).
 9 – The 18th Øyafestivalen started in Oslo, Norway ( August 9–13).
 10
 The 5th Kids in Jazz festival started in Oslo, Norway as part of the Oslo Jazzfestival (August 10–14).
 The 30th Sildajazz started in Haugesund, Norway (August 10–16).
 11 – The Tromsø Jazz Festival started in Tromsø (August 11 – 14).
 14 – The 31st Oslo Jazzfestival started in Oslo, Norway with opening concert by Jan Garbarek Group featuring Trilok Gurtu (August 14 – 20).

September 
 4 – The 11th Punktfestivalen started in Kristiansand, Norway ( September 4–6).

October 
 13 – The 33rd DølaJazz started in Lillehammer, Norway ( October 13–16).

November 
 9 – The Vardø Blues Festival (Blues i Vintermørket) started (November 9 – 13).

December 
 11 – The Nobel Peace Prize Concert was held at Telenor Arena.
 29 – The 11th RIBBEjazz starts in Lillestrøm, Norway.

Albums released

January

February

March

April

May

June

July

August

September

October

November

December

New Artists 
 Aksel Rykkvin, boy soprano nominated for Spellemannprisen, and named "The Musician of the Year" during the national part of the Youth Music Championship 2016-2017.
 Astrid S, singer and recipient of the newcomer Spellemannprisen.

Deaths 

January
 5 – Hanna-Marie Weydahl, classical pianist (born 1922).
 25 – Leif Solberg, contemporary classical composer and organist (born 1914).

February
 19 – Harald Devold, jazz saxophonist (born 1964).

March
 11 – Kari Diesen Jr., entertainer (born 1939).

April
 4 – Andris Snortheim, children's musician (born 1950).
 24 – Jan Henrik Kayser, classical pianist (born 1933).

May
 25 – Per Øien, classical flutist (born 1937).

June
 8 – Terje Fjærn, jazz and pop music orchestra conductor, "La det swinge" (born 1942).
 17 – Willy Andresen, jazz pianist and bandleader (born 1921).
 18 – Sverre Kjelsberg, popular music singer and bassist (born 1946).

July
 31 – Jon Klette, jazz saxophonist (born 1962).

August
 10 – Per Müller, musician and singer (born 1932).
 18 – Fred Nøddelund, jazz flugelhornist and band leader (born 1947).

September
 9 – Knut Wiggen, contemporary classical composer (born 1927).
 30 – Lilleba Lund Kvandal, opra singer (born 1940).

November
 30 – Ivar Thomassen, traditional folk singer, songwriter, and jazz pianist (born 1954).

See also
 2016 in Norway
 Music of Norway
 Norway in the Eurovision Song Contest 2016
 Spellemannprisen
 Buddyprisen
 Nordlysprisen
 Edvard Grieg Memorial Award
 Thorgeir Stubø Memorial Award
 Rolf Gammleng Memorial Award
 Radka Toneff Memorial Award

References

 
Norwegian music
Norwegian
Music
2010s in Norwegian music